SETC may refer to:

 State Express Transport Corporation, a state-owned transport corporation in the Indian state of Tamil Nadu
 Strong Europe Tank Challenge, an annual tank crew competition hosted by the U.S. Army Europe and the German Army
Suez Economic and Trade Cooperation Zone
 "set byte to 1 on carry" (SETC), one of the SETcc instructions in the x86 instruction set
 SetC; see Cartesian closed category
 Southeastern Theatre Conference, a non-profit organization; see Centre Stage
 State Economic and Trade Commission, a Chinese agency now merged into the National Development and Reform Commission
 Surface-Engineered Tape Casting, a method of fabricating carbon nanotubes